Holothuria (Semperothuria) flavomaculata, also known as the red snakefish,  is a species of sea cucumber in the family Holothuriidae. The cucumber is found in the Red Sea, Indian Ocean, and the South Pacific. The subgenus Selenkothuria comprises 12 species of tropical shallow water sea cucumbers that share morphological features, such as rods in the body wall and tube feet, modified tentacles for suspension feeding, and cryptic colours. A study of the species in 2008 collected specimens at a depth of 6 to 14 meters.

References 

Holothuriidae